Japanese Used Motor Vehicle Exporting Association (JUMVEA) is a trade association that began on September 14, 1995. On June 1, 1997, with the approval of the Ministry of International Trade and Industry, it was incorporated.

Purpose 
The trade association exchanges information, establishes order of fair trade in the used motor vehicle industry, and supports the development of the used motor export business while also conducting joint-business activities required by members, promoting economic activities for members, and improving their social and economic standing.

History 
The drastically eased regulations regarding vehicle exports and the simplification of business made it possible for anyone to join the export business, resulting in more competition and an increase in illegal exports, including the export of stolen vehicles and illegally rebuilt or remodeled vehicles. JUMVEA was established as an organization to bring a standard to exports and nurture importers trust. Exporters who are a part of the association must meet that standard.

Related Pages
 Japanese used vehicle exporting
 Grey import vehicles

External links
 JUMVEA

Motor trade associations
Trade associations based in Japan
Organizations established in 1995
Automotive industry in Japan
Used car market